Myrtle Grove is a historic home in Easton, Talbot County, Maryland.  It consists of a frame section dating from the first half of the 18th century, a 1790 Flemish bond brick section, and a 1927 frame wing. The oldest section is five bays wide and one and a half stories tall on a brick foundation laid in English bond.

It was listed on the National Register of Historic Places in 1974.

References

External links
, including photo in 1976, at Maryland Historical Trust
Myrtle Grove (House), Goldsborough Neck Road, Easton, Talbot, MD at the Historic American Buildings Survey (HABS)

Easton, Maryland
Houses on the National Register of Historic Places in Maryland
Houses in Talbot County, Maryland
Houses completed in 1790
Historic American Buildings Survey in Maryland
National Register of Historic Places in Talbot County, Maryland
Goldsborough family